The basketball tournament at the 1987 Mediterranean Games was held in Latakia, Syria.

Medalists

References
1987 Competition Medalists

Basketball
Basketball at the Mediterranean Games
International basketball competitions hosted by Syria
1987–88 in European basketball
1987 in Asian basketball
1987 in African basketball